Latitude on the River is a complex of residential and office towers in Downtown Miami, Florida, United States.  The complex consists of the 44-story north tower (476 ft / 145 m) Latitude on the River and the 23-story, 93 meter south tower Latitude One (both completed in 2007).

The complex is located on the southern banks of the Miami River in downtown. The building was one of the three Miami Riverfront luxury condominiums that sued manufacturers for Faulty Fire Sprinkler Systems. Also, found defective Chinese drywall in 29 of its units when the association hired an engineering firm to confirm the presence of the imported drywall through x-ray analysis and laboratory testing. Defective drywall is strongly associated with the release of foul-smelling sulfurous gases that damage building materials, appliances, pipes and other equipment, according to the federal government. The building sat largely empty during the recession as the Related Group, one of South Florida's premier condo developers, desperately tried to sell units, at one point offering a one-year lease of a Mini Cooper to buyers.

See also
List of tallest buildings in Miami

References

Buildings and structures completed in 2007
Skyscraper office buildings in Miami
Residential skyscrapers in Miami
2007 establishments in Florida
Arquitectonica buildings